Dicephalarcha herbosa is a moth of the family Tortricidae. It is found in Thailand, India, southern Sulawesi, Java, Borneo, Bali and the Moluccas.

The wingspan 10–13 mm. The forewings are dark fuscous on the costal half, while the lower half of the wing is pale bluish grey. The hindwings are dark grey, becoming blackish towards the apex.

References

Moths described in 1909
Olethreutini